This is a list of Indiana Hoosiers basketball players who have attained notability through their performance in the sport of basketball and other endeavors. The list is presented in alphabetical order but is sortable by the years and positions at which they played.

List of current and former players

References 

 
Indiana Hoosiers basketball players